Simranjeet Singh (born 27 December 1996) is an Indian field hockey player who plays as a midfielder for the Indian national team.

He was part of the Indian squad that won the 2016 Men's Hockey Junior World Cup. He made his senior team debut in 2018 and was part of India's silver medal winning team at the 2018 Men's Hockey Champions Trophy.

Singh was trained at the Surjit Hockey Academy in Jalandhar. His cousin Gurjant Singh is also an international hockey player.

References

External links
Simranjeet Singh at Hockey India

1996 births
Living people
Indian male field hockey players
Field hockey players from Punjab, India
Male field hockey midfielders
Olympic field hockey players of India
Field hockey players at the 2020 Summer Olympics
Field hockey players at the 2018 Asian Games
2018 Men's Hockey World Cup players
Asian Games bronze medalists for India
Asian Games medalists in field hockey
Medalists at the 2018 Asian Games
Olympic bronze medalists for India
Medalists at the 2020 Summer Olympics
Olympic medalists in field hockey
Recipients of the Arjuna Award